Jake Shaw Verity (born December 23, 1997) is an American football placekicker for the Tampa Bay Buccaneers of the National Football League (NFL). He played college football at East Carolina and was signed as an undrafted free agent by the Baltimore Ravens in 2021.

Early life 
Verity attended Bremen High School in Georgia, where he was credited with a 63-yard field goal on a fair catch kick, the third-longest field goal in Georgia High School Association history.

College career 
Verity attended East Carolina University and played for the East Carolina Pirates football team. At East Carolina, he was a two-time All-American Athletic Conference selection, a semi-finalist for the Lou Groza Award in 2019, an award given to the top placekicker in college football, and was East Carolina's all-time leading scorer by the time his collegiate career finished.

Although he had one year of eligibility remaining, Verity opted to enter the 2021 NFL Draft.

Professional career

Baltimore Ravens 
After going undrafted in the 2021 NFL Draft, Verity signed with the Baltimore Ravens on May 18, 2021. He was waived by the Ravens in the final round of preseason roster cuts on August 31, 2021 and re-signed to their practice squad the next day. He suffered a torn ACL on December 1 and was ruled out for the season.

Indianapolis Colts
On February 8, 2022, the Indianapolis Colts signed Verity to a reserve/future contract. He was waived on August 25, 2022.

Jacksonville Jaguars
On August 26, 2022, Verity was claimed off waivers by the Jacksonville Jaguars. He was waived/injured on August 31 and placed on injured reserve. He was released on September 6.

Tampa Bay Buccaneers
On January 25, 2023, Verity signed a reserve/future contract with the Tampa Bay Buccaneers.

References

External links 
 
 East Carolina Pirates profile

1997 births
Living people
People from Bremen, Georgia
Players of American football from Georgia (U.S. state)
American football placekickers
East Carolina Pirates football players
Baltimore Ravens players
Indianapolis Colts players
Jacksonville Jaguars players
Tampa Bay Buccaneers players